If 4 is the fourth album released by the English jazz rock band If. It was first issued in 1972 and the last album to feature the original recording line-up. Capitol Records, the band's U.S. label, declined to issue this fourth album. Most of the tracks on this album were issued in the U.S. on Waterfall, in a slightly different form (and with a new line-up), by Metromedia Records.

If 4 was reissued in CD by Repertoire in 2007.

Track listing

Side one
 "Sector 17" (Quincy) – 10:34
 "The Light Still Shines" (Quincy, Humphrey) – 5:06
 "You in Your Small Corner" (Quincy, Humphrey) – 3:49

Side two
 "Waterfall" (D. Morrissey, B. Morrissey) – 5:27
 "Throw Myself to the Wind" (D. Morrissey, B. Morrissey) – 4:51
 "Svenska Soma" (Jonsson-Smith) – 7:09

Personnel
 Dennis Elliott – drums
 J.W. Hodgkinson – vocals, percussion
 John Mealing – keyboards
 Dick Morrissey – saxophones, flute
 Dave Quincy – saxophones
 Jim Richardson – bass
 Terry Smith – guitar

External links
 

1972 albums
If (band) albums
Island Records albums